Gregory Devon Lewis (born September 6, 1978) is an American former professional basketball player. In college, he was the Big South Conference player of the year as a senior in 2001–02. He was also a two-time Big South tournament MVP in 2000 and 2002. Since graduating he has played professionally in numerous countries, and in 2012–13 he was named Latinbasket.com's All-Liga Americas MVP while playing for Asociación Deportiva Atenas in Argentina.

Early years
Greg Lewis grew up in Akron, Ohio without a father and admitted that he was "a little wild" as a youth. He would run away from home, and his grades at Akron East High School suffered due to his absences (he had to repeat his sophomore year because he missed 160 days of school). Lewis became more focused when he met an ordained minister by the name of John Saucier. Saucier had started Team JAM (Jesus, Athletics, Ministry), a basketball program used to create better role models out of troubled or disadvantaged high schoolers. Saucier also convinced Lewis to attend Medina First Baptist School for a fifth year of high school due to his grades at Akron East. In his final prep year, Lewis increased his grade point average from 0.9 at Akron East to 2.9 by graduation at Medina. On the basketball court, he averaged 29.6 points and 13 rebounds per game en route to all-state honors.

College
Unable to play for an NCAA Division I right away, Lewis signed to play for Seward County Community College in Kansas, but due to frequent run-ins with their head coach, he stayed only one semester. The following year, Lewis enrolled at Howard College in Texas, where he averaged 17.9 points and 8.0 rebounds per game and led the team to a 26–6 record. After his year at Howard, he wanted to play for the University of South Alabama, but his mother would not sign the scholarship papers because she felt uncomfortable with that decision, citing that they "did not have his best interest at heart."

Winthrop University, whose team needed one more forward, still had one scholarship left to offer, so coach Gregg Marshall offered it to Lewis. He accepted, and in 1999–2000 he began his Division I career as a Winthrop Eagle. In his first season averaged 15.7 points and 6.7 rebounds per game, was named the Big South tournament MVP as well as an All-Big South First Team selection. They entered the 2000 NCAA tournament as a 14-seed but lost to Oklahoma, a three-seed, in the first round.

In 2000–01, in what should have been Lewis' true senior season, he sustained a foot injury just six games into the season that sidelined him for the whole year. The NCAA gave him a medical redshirt, thus his final collegiate season was actually in 2001–02. That year, Lewis averaged 15.4 points, 10.1 rebounds, and 1.5 steals per game. The Eagles were co-champions of the Big South regular season and once again won the Big South tournament where they earned a berth into the NCAA tournament. Lewis was named the conference tournament's MVP for a second time as well as another All-Big South First Team selection. He was named the Big South Player of the Year as well as an Honorable Mention All-American by the Associated Press. The Eagles lost to the Duke Blue Devils in the first round of the NCAA Tournament, ending Lewis' collegiate career. He finished his career at Winthrop with 993 points and 542 rebounds in 67 games played.

Professional
Lewis was not selected in the 2002 NBA draft. He has been a journeyman throughout his career, playing in leagues in the United States, Argentina, Brazil, Venezuela, Paraguay, New Zealand, Mexico, and Finland. In 2012–13 he was named Latinbasket.com's All-Liga Americas MVP while playing for Asociación Deportiva Atenas in Argentina.

References

External links
College statistics @ sports-reference.com

1978 births
Living people
American expatriate basketball people in Argentina
American expatriate basketball people in Brazil
American expatriate basketball people in Finland
American expatriate basketball people in Mexico
American expatriate basketball people in New Zealand
American expatriate basketball people in Paraguay
American expatriate basketball people in Venezuela
American men's basketball players
Atenas basketball players
Basketball players from Akron, Ohio
Club San Martín de Corrientes basketball players
Howard Hawks men's basketball players
KTP-Basket players
Marinos B.B.C. players
Power forwards (basketball)
Waikato Titans players
Winthrop Eagles men's basketball players
Soles de Mexicali players